The following outline is provided as an overview of and topical guide to Iceland:

Iceland – sovereign island nation located in the North Atlantic Ocean between continental Europe and Greenland.  It is considered part of Northern Europe.  It is the least populous of the Nordic countries, having a population of about 329,000 (January 1, 2015).  Iceland is volcanically and geologically active on a large scale; this defines the landscape in various ways. The interior mainly consists of a plateau characterized by sand fields, mountains and glaciers, while many big glacial rivers flow to the sea through the lowlands. Warmed by the Gulf Stream, Iceland has a temperate climate relative to its latitude and provides a habitable environment and nature.

General reference 

 Pronunciation: Iceland
 Common English country name: Iceland
 Official English country name: Iceland
 Common endonym(s): Ísland
 Official endonym(s): Ísland
 Adjectival(s): Icelandic 
 Demonym(s): Icelander(s)
 Etymology: Name of Iceland
 ISO country codes:  IS, ISL, 352
 ISO region codes:  See ISO 3166-2:IS
 Internet country code top-level domain: .is

Geography of Iceland 

Geography of Iceland
 Iceland is: a Nordic island country
 Land boundaries:  none
 Coastline:  4,970 km
 Population of Iceland: 319,326 people (April 2009 estimate) - 172nd most populous country
 Area of Iceland:   - 107th largest country
 Atlas of Iceland

Location of Iceland 
 Iceland is situated within the following regions:
 Northern Hemisphere and Western Hemisphere
 Atlantic Ocean
 North Atlantic
 Eurasia
 Europe
 Northern Europe
 Nordic region
 Time zone: Coordinated Universal Time UTC+00
 Extreme points of Iceland
 High: Hvannadalshnúkur 
 Low: North Atlantic Ocean 0 m

Environment of Iceland 

 Climate of Iceland
 Renewable energy in Iceland
 Geothermal power in Iceland
 Geology of Iceland
 Earthquakes in Iceland
 Volcanism of Iceland
 Iceland hotspot
 Iceland plume
 National parks of Iceland
Snæfellsjökull
Vatnajökull
Þingvellir
 Wildlife of Iceland
 Flora of Iceland
 The Botany of Iceland
 Campanula uniflora
 Cerastium arcticum
 Crowberry
 Dryas octopetala
 Lupinus nootkatensis
 Ranunculus glacialis
 Salix arctica
 Saxifraga cernua
 Saxifraga cespitosa
 Stellaria humifusa
 Fauna of Iceland
 Birds of Iceland
Anatidae
Cygnus olor
Cygnus columbianus
Cygnus cygnus
Anser fabalis
Anser brachyrhynchus
 Insects of Iceland
 Moths of Iceland
 Mammals of Iceland

Geographic features of Iceland 

 Fjords of Iceland
 Glaciers of Iceland
 Highlands of Iceland
 Islands of Iceland
 Lakes of Iceland
 Mountains of Iceland
 Baula
 Borgarvirki
 Búrfellshyrna
 Búlandstindur
 Eldgjá
 Esjan
 Helgafell
 Herðubreið
 Hlíðarfjall
 Hvannadalshnúkur
 Kerling
 Kerlingarfjöll (mountain range)
 Kverkfjöll (mountain range)
 Súlur
 Óshyrna
 Volcanoes in Iceland
 Askja
 Bláhnjúkur
 Brennisteinsalda
 Búrfell
 Hekla
 Helgafell
 Hengill
 Katla
 Kollóttadyngja
 Krafla
 Laki
 Öræfajökull
 Skjaldbreiður
 Snæfellsjökull
 Trölladyngja
 Rivers of Iceland
 Waterfalls of Iceland
 Valleys of Iceland
 World Heritage Sites in Iceland

Regions of Iceland

Region codes 
 NUTS of Iceland
 ISO 3166-2 codes of Iceland
 FIPS region codes of Iceland

Administrative divisions of Iceland 

Administrative divisions of Iceland
 Regions of Iceland
 Counties of Iceland

Constituencies of Iceland 

Constituencies of Iceland
Iceland is divided into 6 constituencies for the purpose of selecting representatives to the Alþingi (parliament):

Reykjavík North (11)
Reykjavík South (11)
Northwest (9)
Northeast (10)
South (10)
Southwest (12)

Municipalities of Iceland 

Municipalities of Iceland
 Cities of Iceland (by population)
 Capital of Iceland: Reykjavík

Demography of Iceland 

Demographics of Iceland

Government and politics of Iceland 

 Form of government: unitary parliamentary representative democratic republic
 Capital of Iceland: Reykjavík
 Elections in Iceland
 Icelandic nationalism
 Liberalism and centrism in Iceland
 Political parties in Iceland
 Icelandic political scandals
 Taxation in Iceland

Branches of the government of Iceland 

Government of Iceland

Executive branch of the government of Iceland 
 Head of state: Guðni Th. Jóhannesson, President of Iceland
 Head of government: Sigurður Ingi Jóhannsson, Prime Minister of Iceland
 First Lady of Iceland
 Cabinet of Iceland
 Cabinet ministers
 Minister of Education, Science and Culture of Iceland: Illugi Gunnarsson
 Minister for the Environment of Iceland: Sigrún Magnúsdóttir
 Minister of Finance of Iceland: Bjarni Benediktsson
 Minister of Fisheries and Agriculture of Iceland: Sigurður Ingi Jóhannsson
 Minister for Foreign Affairs of Iceland: Gunnar Bragi Sveinsson
 Minister of Health: Kristján Þór Júlíusson  (Part of the Ministry of Welfare (Iceland))
 Minister of Social Affairs and Housing: Eygló Harðardóttir (Part of the Ministry of Welfare (Iceland))
 Ministry of Industries and Innovation of Iceland: Ragnheiður Elín Árnadóttir 
Minister of the Interior of Iceland: Ólöf Nordal
 List of cabinets of Iceland
 List of Icelandic ministries

Legislative branch of the government of Iceland 

 Parliament of Iceland
 List of standing committees of the Icelandic parliament
 List of speakers of the Parliament of Iceland

Judicial branch of the government of Iceland 
 Supreme Court of Iceland

Foreign relations of Iceland 

Foreign relations of Iceland
 Accession of Iceland to the European Union
 List of diplomatic missions in Iceland
 List of diplomatic missions of Iceland
 Visa requirements for Icelandic citizens

International organization membership 

International organization membership of Iceland
The Republic of Iceland is a member of:

Arctic Council
Australia Group
Bank for International Settlements (BIS)
Council of Europe (CE)
Council of the Baltic Sea States (CBSS)
Euro-Atlantic Partnership Council (EAPC)
European Bank for Reconstruction and Development (EBRD)
European Free Trade Association (EFTA)
Food and Agriculture Organization (FAO)
International Atomic Energy Agency (IAEA)
International Bank for Reconstruction and Development (IBRD)
International Chamber of Commerce (ICC)
International Civil Aviation Organization (ICAO)
International Criminal Court (ICCt)
International Criminal Police Organization (Interpol)
International Development Association (IDA)
International Federation of Red Cross and Red Crescent Societies (IFRCS)
International Finance Corporation (IFC)
International Fund for Agricultural Development (IFAD)
International Hydrographic Organization (IHO)
International Labour Organization (ILO)
International Maritime Organization (IMO)
International Mobile Satellite Organization (IMSO)
International Monetary Fund (IMF)
International Olympic Committee (IOC)
International Organization for Standardization (ISO)
International Red Cross and Red Crescent Movement (ICRM)

International Telecommunication Union (ITU)
International Telecommunications Satellite Organization (ITSO)
International Trade Union Confederation (ITUC)
Inter-Parliamentary Union (IPU)
Multilateral Investment Guarantee Agency (MIGA)
Nordic Council (NC)
Nordic Investment Bank (NIB)
North Atlantic Treaty Organization (NATO)
Nuclear Energy Agency (NEA)
Organisation for Economic Co-operation and Development (OECD)
Organization for Security and Co-operation in Europe (OSCE)
Organisation for the Prohibition of Chemical Weapons (OPCW)
Organization of American States (OAS) (observer)
Permanent Court of Arbitration (PCA)
Schengen Convention
United Nations (UN)
United Nations Conference on Trade and Development (UNCTAD)
United Nations Educational, Scientific, and Cultural Organization (UNESCO)
Universal Postal Union (UPU)
Western European Union (WEU) (associate)
World Customs Organization (WCO)
World Federation of Trade Unions (WFTU)
World Health Organization (WHO)
World Intellectual Property Organization (WIPO)
World Meteorological Organization (WMO)
World Trade Organization (WTO)

Law and order in Iceland 

Law of Iceland
 Abortion in Iceland
 Cannabis in Iceland
 Capital punishment in Iceland
 Constitution of Iceland
 Human rights in Iceland
 Freedom of religion in Iceland
 LGBT rights in Iceland
 Prostitution in Iceland — in 2009, the paying for sex was outlawed, criminalizing the clients, while selling sex remained decriminalized.
 Icelandic passport
 Law enforcement in Iceland
 National Police of Iceland
 Víkingasveitin (The Viking Squad)

Military of Iceland 

Military of Iceland
 Army: Iceland does not have a standing army
 Navy: No navy (just the Icelandic Coast Guard)
 Air force: None
 Icelandic Coast Guard
 Iceland Air Defence System
 Icelandic Air Policing
 Iceland Crisis Response Unit
 Víkingasveitin: Is equal to the American SWAT unit.
 Military history of Iceland

History of Iceland

By period 
 Settlement of Iceland
 History of Icelandic nationality
 Icelandic Commonwealth
 Age of the Sturlungs
 Farthings of Iceland
 Christianisation of Iceland
 Icelandic Reformation
 Danish-Icelandic Trade Monopoly
 New Iceland
 Kingdom of Iceland
 Prohibition in Iceland
 Iceland during World War II
 Invasion of Iceland
 Military operations in Scandinavia and Iceland during World War II
 Founding of the Republic of Iceland
 Iceland in the Cold War
 Iceland Defense Force
 Accession of Iceland to the European Union
 2010 Iceland power outages

By subject 
 Agriculture in Iceland
 Economic history of Iceland
 History of the Jews in Iceland
 Military history of Iceland
 Postage stamps and postal history of Iceland
 List of rulers of Iceland

Culture of Iceland 

 Architecture of Iceland
 Icelandic turf houses
 List of tallest buildings in Iceland
 List of tallest structures in Iceland
 Icelandic cuisine
 Beer in Iceland
 Festivals in Iceland
 Iceland Airwaves
 Heraldry in Iceland
 Media of Iceland
 Miss Iceland
 Museums in Iceland
 National and University Library of Iceland
 National symbols of Iceland
 Coat of arms of Iceland
 Flag of Iceland
 List of flags of Iceland
 National anthem of Iceland
 Order of the Falcon
 Prostitution in Iceland — in 2009, the paying for sex was outlawed, criminalizing the clients, while selling sex remained decriminalized.
 Public holidays in Iceland
 First Day of Summer
 Icelandic National Day
 Smoking in Iceland
 Icelandic weddings
 World Heritage Sites in Iceland

Art in Iceland 
 Icelandic art
 Cinema of Iceland
 List of Icelandic films
 List of Icelandic submissions for the Academy Award for Best Foreign Language Film
 Icelandic cuisine
 Þorramatur
 Icelandic literature
 List of Icelandic-language poets
 List of Icelandic writers
 Music of Iceland
 List of Icelandic composers
 Icelandic folk music
 Icelandic hip hop
 Icelandic rock
 List of bands from Iceland
 Television in Iceland

Language in Iceland 

 Languages of Iceland
 Icelandic language
 History of Icelandic
 Icelandic exonyms
 Icelandic grammar
 Icelandic Literary Society
 Icelandic name
 Icelandic Naming Committee
 Icelandic orthography
 Icelandic phonology
 Linguistic purism in Icelandic
 High Icelandic
 Icelandic vocabulary
 Icelandic Sign Language

Religion in Iceland 

Religion in Iceland
 Icelandic funeral
 Religions in Iceland
 Christianity in Iceland
 Church of Iceland
 Roman Catholicism in Iceland
 Neopaganism in Iceland
 Bahá'í Faith in Iceland
 Buddhism in Iceland
 Islam in Iceland
 Judaism in Iceland
 History of the Jews in Iceland

Sport in Iceland 

Sport in Iceland

 Icelandic Chess Championship
 Cricket in Iceland
 Iceland at the Paralympics
 Icelandic records in athletics
 Strength athletics in Iceland
 Íþróttafélag Reykjavíkur

Olympics 
 Iceland at the Olympics

Baseball 
 Iceland national baseball team

Basketball 
 Iceland men's national basketball team
 Iceland women's national basketball team

Football 
 Australian rules football in Iceland
 Football Association of Iceland
 Icelandic football league system
 List of football clubs in Iceland
 List of football stadiums in Iceland
 National football teams
 Iceland national football team
 Iceland national under-17 football team
 Iceland women's national football team

Handball 
 Icelandic Handball Association
 Iceland men's national handball team

Ice hockey 
 Ice Hockey Iceland
 Icelandic Hockey League
 Icelandic national ice hockey team
 Iceland women's national ice hockey team

Rowing 
 Fiann Paul

Tennis 
 Iceland Davis Cup team
 Iceland Fed Cup team

Sports personalities 
Eiður Smári Guðjohnsen
 Heiðar Helguson, professional footballer, currently at Fulham
 Hermann Hreiðarsson
 Jón Páll Sigmarsson
 Magnús Ver Magnússon
 Ólafur Stefánsson
 Anníe Mist Þórisdóttir

Economy and infrastructure of Iceland 

Economy of Iceland
 Economic rank, by nominal GDP (2007): 92nd (ninety-second)
 2008–2012 Icelandic financial crisis
 Agriculture in Iceland
 Whaling in Iceland
 Banking in Iceland
 Banks of Iceland
 Central Bank of Iceland
 National Bank of Iceland
 Communications in Iceland
 List of newspapers in Iceland
 List of postal codes in Iceland
 Telecommunications in Iceland
 Internet in Iceland
 Telephone numbers in Iceland
 Companies of Iceland
 List of companies of Iceland
 Companies listed on the Iceland Stock Exchange
Currency of Iceland: Króna
ISO 4217: ISK
 Economic history of Iceland
 Energy in Iceland
 2010 Iceland power outages
 Iceland Deep Drilling Project
 Power stations in Iceland
 Icelandic hydroelectric power stations
 Renewable energy in Iceland
 Geothermal power in Iceland
 Healthcare in Iceland
 Emergency medical services in Iceland
 List of hospitals in Iceland
 National parks of Iceland
 Iceland Stock Exchange
 Tourism in Iceland
 Trade unions
 Confederation of State and Municipal Employees of Iceland
 Icelandic Federation of Labour
 Transport in Iceland
 Airports in Iceland
 Rail transport in Iceland - Iceland has no public rail system.
 Roads in Iceland
 Highway system of Iceland
 Road signs in Iceland
 Speed limits in Iceland
 Street names in Iceland
 Tunnels in Iceland
 Vehicle registration plates of Iceland

Education in Iceland 

Education in Iceland
 Academic grading in Iceland
 Icelandic Student Loan Fund
 List of schools in Iceland
 Universities in Iceland
 University of Iceland
 National and University Library of Iceland

See also

 Asteroid 110299 Iceland named after the island in 2018
 Index of Iceland-related articles
 List of international rankings
 Member state of the North Atlantic Treaty Organization
 Member state of the United Nations

References

External links
 Gateway to Iceland
 Government Offices of Iceland
 Icelandic Government Information Center
 
 
 

 
 
Iceland